Elim Church (Singapore) or Elim Church Assembly of God is one of the first Pentecostal churches to be established in Singapore. Founded in 1928,  it is the first and oldest Assemblies of God church in the city-state.

The church is located at 1079 Serangoon Road. It is approximately 550 metres from Boon Keng MRT station.

The church represents a wide range of ages, cultures and backgrounds. It conducts several multi-lingual services on Sundays. All services involve lay participation.

History

Elim Church began as a small gathering of Christians in 1928. It was pastored by Rev. Cecil and Mrs. Edith Jackson.

In 1937, the Jacksons were replaced by Rev. and Mrs. Lawrence McKinney. They embarked on a building project for a more permanent premise for the church. After months of prayer, a property at 1079 Serangoon Road was secured. It was a bungalow with a large compound, surrounded by an abundance of trees. Rev. McKinney named it Elim Church Assembly of God because it reminded him of the Israelites when they came to Elim after their exodus from Egypt. A dedication service for the new church was held on Friday, 20 October 1939. 

The church continued to grow until the outbreak of the Second World War (1942–1945). During the Japanese Occupation of Singapore, lay leaders were appointed by Rev. McKinney to manage the church. They were Lye Eng Hong, Victor Manny, Arthur P. Abeysekera and Yeo Bock Hoe.

After the war ended, the church came under the leadership of Rev. Alfred A. McGrew (1949–1953), Rev. R.B. and Mrs. Avalone Cavaness (1954–1966), Rev. David and Mrs. Betty Baker (1968–1969), Rev. Fred and Mrs. Rita Abeysekera (1969–1974), Rev. Cresmerio and Mrs. Norma Fernandez (1976–1987), and Rev. Dr. Fred and Margaret Seaward (1987–2006). On 1 July 2006, Rev. Glen Lim Cheng Huat took over as Senior Pastor of the church.

Culture

Vision

The church places an emphasis on the missions field. Its vision is to be a Spirit-filled people and a Spirit-filled Church — reaching the spiritually unresolved in Singapore and beyond.

Values

The church is committed to:

Growing upward in worship and celebration.
Growing inward in faith and commitment.
Going forward in love and unity.
Glowing outward in ministry and evangelism.

See also

Assemblies of God
Christianity in Singapore
Megachurch
Pentecostalism

References

External links
Official website of Elim Church, Singapore
Official website of The Assemblies of God of Singapore

Churches in Singapore
Assemblies of God churches
1928 establishments in Singapore
Churches completed in 1939
20th-century architecture in Singapore